The Brentford branch line, also known as the Brentford Dock Line, is a freight-only branch railway line in west London, England. The route, which opened in 1859, was backed by the Great Western Railway and built by the Great Western & Brentford Railway Company. It ran  from Southall to Brentford Dock. In 1964, the line to the wharves was closed. The branch now runs from the Great Western Main Line to a goods yard and waste transfer station in Brentford.

History

Early years
The line was proposed by the Great Western Railway (GWR) during the 1840s, as a means of reaching the inner London docks via the River Thames. Brentford was chosen as the most suitable location for the terminus of the line, being the point where the Great Western Main Line is nearest to the Thames, and also the point where the Grand Junction Canal meets the river.

In August 1855, an Act of Parliament incorporated the Great Western & Brentford Railway Company, which had been promoted by the GWR. Construction of the line, and the dock at Brentford, began shortly after, with Isambard Kingdom Brunel as chief engineer. The line was built from a down-facing connection with the GWML at Southall, to Brunel's 7 ft 1⁄4 in (2,140 mm) broad gauge. However, it took three years to complete due to the need to build a three-level bridge at Windmill Lane, Southall, where the line passed underneath both the road and the Grand Junction Canal.

Brunel's famous 'Three Bridges' has the road cross above the Grand Junction Canal, with the railway in a cutting beneath the two. The Three Bridges bridge crossing is a unique transport intersection, and was to be Brunel's last project before he died on 15 September 1859 just two months after its completion. The correct name for it should be Windmill Bridge – named after the Southall Mill, which stood on the south-western side of the original canal bridge which was first built in the 1790s when the canal was cut. J. M. W. Turner painted this windmill in 1806. The Three Bridges has been designated a Scheduled Ancient Monument by English Heritage.

The line and the dock were officially opened on 15 July 1859, with freight services on the line commencing three days later. From the outset, these services were worked by the GWR, who leased the line from the Great Western & Brentford Railway Company. In February 1872, following a number of disputes, the Brentford company was amalgamated into the GWR.

A passenger service had also been projected during construction, and thus a separate platform at Southall station was set aside for this purpose. The service eventually commenced on 1 May 1860.

In 1861, the line was doubled, a standard gauge track being laid alongside the original broad gauge track. The new track was used by the freight services, while passenger trains continued to use the broad gauge track. Complete conversion of the line to standard gauge took place in 1875.

Passenger service
When the passenger service commenced, trains ran between the dedicated platform at Southall and a station on what is now the A315 London Road in Brentford, with no intermediate stops. A second station was built at the dock for excursions connecting with the ferry across the Thames to Kew Gardens, but there is no record of this station ever being used.

Railmotors began operating the service on 2 May 1904, and on 1 July that year a halt at Trumpers Crossing, a mile and a half down the line from Southall, was opened.

The service was withdrawn on 22 March 1915 as a wartime economy measure, and was reinstated on weekdays on 12 April 1920 following local pressure. Trumpers Crossing Halte closed permanently on 1 February 1926.

Passenger numbers declined during the interwar period as road transport became more and more popular, and the service was finally withdrawn for good on 4 May 1942.

After World War II
On 1 January 1948 the GWR, along with the other railway companies in Britain, was nationalised under the Transport Act 1947. The Brentford branch line, now freight-only, thus became part of the Western Region of British Railways. In 1956, the line was converted back to single track.

Freight traffic on the line had increased during the 1930s as a result of the development of Brentford's Golden Mile and the consequent opening, in November 1930, of the Brentford Town Goods yard. This increase continued in the years immediately following World War II, until by 1951 there were as many as 25 goods trains a day. By the start of the 1960s, however, the factories served by the yard had begun to switch their freight to road transport, while at the same time the dock (which was claimed at one time to cater for as much as ten percent of the country's trade) was in decline as containerisation became popular in the shipping industry.

The dock finally closed on 31 December 1964, after which the line south of Brentford Town Goods was dismantled. Parts of the viaduct which carried the line into the dock remain intact, as does the embankment on which Brentford station stood.

Brentford Town Goods itself closed in December 1970. In 1977, a waste transfer station opened on the site of the yard, after the Greater London Council did a deal with British Rail to use the line for the transport of rubbish. As of 2013, there were four trains leaving the station each week.

The line is also currently used for the transport of construction aggregates, from a site just to the north of the waste transfer station.

Proposed reopening

In April 2017, it was proposed that the line could reopen to allow a new link between Southall to Hounslow and possibly up to the planned Old Oak Common station with a new station in Brentford called Brentford Golden Mile.  The proposals suggested that the service could be operated by Great Western Railway and could be open by 2020 with a new service from Southall to Hounslow and possible later to Old Oak Common.

This line has been identified by Campaign for a Better Transport as a candidate for reopening.

Brentford 150 festival exhibition
This exhibition in June/July 2009 celebrated the 150th anniversary of the Brentford Dock branch line.  It was held at the Musical Museum in Brentford and organized jointly by the Museum and the now-defunct Great Western Railway Preservation Group.

Images

References

Rail transport in London
Great Western Railway constituents
7 ft gauge railways
Railway lines opened in 1859